The Muskego-Norway School District is a school district in southeastern Wisconsin that serves students in the Waukesha County suburb of Muskego, part of Norway, a small part of New Berlin, and most of Wind Lake. The district has an enrollment of nearly 4,900 students in three elementary schools, two middle schools, and one high school. There are about 327 teachers and 19 administrators employed by the district.

Schools

References

External links

School districts in Wisconsin
Education in Waukesha County, Wisconsin
Education in Racine County, Wisconsin